Jim Walden (born April 10, 1938) is a former American football player  He was the head coach at Washington State University from 1978 to 1986 and at Iowa State University from 1987 to 1994, compiling a career college football record of  over

Playing career
Born and raised in Aberdeen, Mississippi, Walden played quarterback at Itawamba Junior College in Fulton and then for head coach Bob Devaney at the University of Wyoming in Laramie. Walden led the Cowboys to consecutive Skyline Conference titles and was the league's player of the year as a senior in 1959.

He was drafted by both the Cleveland of the NFL and Denver Broncos in the first AFL Draft in 1960. Walden was offered more money by the BC Lions of the Canadian Football League (CFL) and elected to sign in the CFL. He played several seasons in Canada as a backup quarterback before starting his coaching career at the high school level in Amory, Mississippi.

Coaching career
Walden began his college coaching career at the University of Nebraska in Lincoln on Devaney's staff, where he assisted on consecutive national championship teams in 1970 and 1971. After the 1972 season, Devaney retired and Walden then coached for four seasons at the University of Miami under Pete Elliott and fellow Devaney assistant, Carl Selmer.

Washington State
Walden followed Warren Powers, another Devaney assistant, to Washington State University in Pullman as offensive backfield coach in 1977 and when Powers left for the University of Missouri after the season, Walden succeeded him as head coach of the Cougars. He was the head coach at WSU from 1978 through 1986, compiling a  record in nine seasons and coached some of the greatest players in school history, including Jack Thompson, Rueben Mayes, Kerry Porter, Ricky Reynolds, Paul Sorensen, Pat Beach, Brian Forde, Lee Blakeney, Mark Rypien, Dan Lynch, Keith Millard, and Erik Howard.

In his fourth season in 1981, Walden led the 8–2–1 Cougars to the Holiday Bowl, the school's first bowl appearance in 51 years, where they lost a  donnybrook to BYU, quarterbacked by Jim McMahon. That season, Walden was selected as the Pac-10 Coach of the Year. In 1985, WSU won their third Apple Cup in four seasons, a feat they have accomplished only two other times (in 1954 and 2007).

Prior to the 1985 Apple Cup, in which the Washington Huskies were favored, Husky coach Don James jovially contrasted himself to Walden by quipping, "I'm a 2,000-word underdog."

Following a 3–7–1 season in 1986, Walden left in mid-December to become the 28th head coach for Iowa State, and Dennis Erickson became the Cougars' next head coach.

Iowa State
Walden succeeded Jim Criner at Iowa State, where he compiled a  record over eight seasons. ISU had been hit with scholarship reductions by the NCAA, both because of infractions by the previous coach, and an overall reduction in scholarships for Division I-A for the 1988 season. In his first four years as Iowa State's head coach, he had just 57, 61, 63, and 67 scholarship players. Walden had 47 scholarship players on his 1989 squad that he brought to Lincoln to play Nebraska on October 28. They lost 17–49.

Prior to Matt Campbell defeating Oklahoma on October 7, 2017, Walden was the last Iowa State coach to defeat Oklahoma, which they did on October 20, 1990. Oklahoma was ranked 16th in the nation at the time. They had narrowly missed an upset the year before, losing in Ames 40–43. His best record with the Cyclones was 6–5 in 1989. After the 1989 season, Walden was offered a head coaching job at the University of Arizona, but he declined the job, citing a number of people at Iowa State telling him it would be "devastating" if he left. In retrospect, Walden said he was "too dumb" to leave.

Walden's teams were plagued with injuries, especially at quarterback. In 1991, third-string quarterback Kevin Caldwell started the final five games of the season; he began the season as a tailback. Walden played four quarterbacks in a 41–0 loss to Kansas in 1991. In 1992, Walden installed the triple-option offense and had mixed results. Iowa State lost to in-state rivals Iowa and UNI early in the 1992 season. The loss to UNI was the first loss by Jim Walden to a Division 1AA school. It was also UNI's first victory over the Cyclones since 1900. Iowa State bounced back to shock the seventh ranked Nebraska Cornhuskers at home on November 14, 1992. The victory was even more improbable because Walden was starting his third-string quarterback, Marv Seiler, for the first time. Walden's 1993 squad went 3–8, but with an upset of 18th ranked Kansas State. Walden ended the 1993 campaign starting a walk-on quarterback, Jeff St. Clair.

In the spring of 1994, Walden secured star running back Troy Davis from Florida. Davis later had consecutive 2,000-yard rushing seasons, but it was after Walden's departure.

After starting the 1994 campaign 0–2, many fans began to criticize his coaching ability. He began his weekly press conference by handing out the records of Dennis Erickson, Johnny Majors, and Earle Bruce while they were at Washington State and Iowa State. He then handed out Iowa State's overall record in football since fielding its first team in 1892, which, at the time, was 423–461–45—a .480 percentage, and compared his record to that one. Walden claimed that he was as good a coach or better than Erickson, Majors, and Bruce. The difference was, according to Walden, they left for better schools while he stayed at Iowa State.

On Thursday, November 3, 1994, after starting the season 0–7–1, Walden informed his team that he would resign at season's end. He was allowed to coach his final three games by the university, but banned from coaching his last game at Colorado because of criticizing the officials after the Kansas State game. Kansas State's Nyle Wiren had body-slammed Walden's quarterback Todd Doxzon into the turf head first. Nothing was called and Walden, with nothing to lose, went off on the officiating after the game:

Walden coached his final game on November 12 against the Nebraska Cornhuskers in Ames. Iowa State had an 0–8–1 record and Nebraska was undefeated, with a number one ranking. Unbelievably Walden's Cyclones hung with the Huskers. At the end of the third quarter, Nebraska led by only two points, 14–12. The final quarter proved to be too much for Walden's team, and Nebraska won the game 28–12.

The Cyclones finished with a winless 0–10–1 record in 1994. Walden ranks sixth at Iowa State in total wins and 22nd winning percentage.

Walden made an ominous statement about coaches who stay at Iowa State:

Later life
After retiring from Iowa State, Walden served as a radio color commentator, first for the Iowa Barnstormers of the Arena Football League and later back in Pullman for Washington  He still hosts a Sunday evening radio show in Iowa on WHO called "Two Guys Named Jim". In the final regular season Harris Interactive Poll in 2006, he was the only voter to have Florida at No. 1; the other 112 No. 1 votes went to Ohio State. Florida handily defeated Ohio State 41–14 in the BCS National Championship Game on January 8, 2007.

Walden  lost his wife, Janice. after a long battle with cancer on November 13, 2005. After meeting at the University of Wyoming in 1958. the couple married in the spring of 1960. They had three children: two daughters, Lisa (born in 1961) and Emily (1965), and one son, Murray (1967).

Head coaching record

References

External links
 University of Wyoming Athletics Hall of Fame profile

1938 births
Living people
American football quarterbacks
American players of Canadian football
Canadian football quarterbacks
BC Lions players
Calgary Stampeders players
Edmonton Elks players
Iowa State Cyclones football coaches
Itawamba Indians football players
Miami Hurricanes football coaches
Nebraska Cornhuskers football coaches
Washington State Cougars football coaches
Wyoming Cowboys football players
High school football coaches in Mississippi
People from Aberdeen, Mississippi
Coaches of American football from Mississippi
Players of American football from Mississippi